Mr Twin Sister (formerly Twin Sister) is an American band from New York City. Their music has been described as chill wave, indie pop, dream pop, and disco. They have been compared to Cocteau Twins and Portishead. They have toured the US and Europe and have so far released three EPs and three LPs.

The band members are singer Andrea Estella, keyboardist Dev Gupta, bassist Gabel D'Amico, and guitarist-singer Eric Cardona.

History 

The band formed in 2008 when the five members of Twin Sister came together to work on Vampires With Dreaming Kids. They relocated to Brooklyn where they built a small following. Their EP 'Color Your Life' was released on Domino Records in the UK and Infinite Best in the USA.

Their song 'All Around And Away We Go' was voted No. 59 in the 2010 Pitchfork Media tracks of the year poll and they were voted at No. 3 in the 'Best hope for 2011' section of the readers poll.

The 2012 hip-hop hit 'The Recipe' by Kendrick Lamar featuring Dr. Dre and produced by Scoop Deville samples Twin Sister's song 'Meet the Frownies'.

In 2014, the band changed their name from "Twin Sister" to "Mr Twin Sister".

Andrea Estella replaced Leighton Meester as Carrie Bishop in the Kickstarter-funded Veronica Mars movie, released in 2014.

Discography

Studio albums
In Heaven (September 27, 2011)
Mr Twin Sister (September 23, 2014)
Salt (October 25, 2018)
Al Mundo Azul (November 19, 2021)

EPs

 Vampires With Dreaming Kids (November 1, 2008)
 Color Your Life (March 30, 2010)
 Split (with The Luyas) (April 16, 2011)
Upright And Even (October 28, 2022)

Compilation Albums

 Alternates (March 13, 2010)

Singles

 Bad Street  (September, 2011)
 Kimmi In a Rice Field / Bad Street Remixes (December, 2011)
 The Erotic Book (May, 2015)
 Poor Relations (November, 2016)
 Jaipur (June, 2018)
 Power of Two / Echo Arms (August, 2018)
 Diary / Expressions (February, 2021)
 Re-sort (November, 2022)

Eric Cardona’s Solo Work

 Cell Songs (Album, February 2019)
 Two Moons (Single, March 2019)

References

External links 

Domino Records site
 Twin sister, Soeurs sourire de la pop in Brain magazine

Reviews 
 New York Times review of a May 30, 2010 concert in Williamsburg, Brooklyn
 BBC Review of Vampires With Dreaming Kids / Color Your Life
 Contact Music review of Vampires With Dreaming Kids / Color Your Life
 Drowned In Sound review of Vampires With Dreaming Kids / Color Your Life 
 QRO Magazine review of Color Your Life
 Indiescreent review of Color Your Life
 Pitchfork review of Color Your Life

Indie rock musical groups from New York (state)
Musical groups established in 2008
Musical groups from Long Island
2008 establishments in New York (state)
Domino Recording Company artists
Musical groups from Brooklyn